The Oued Sebt ( واد السبت) is a small river in Algeria between the city of Gouraya, Tipaza and meselmoun. The post code for the area is 19542.

References

Sebt
Bodies of water of Algeria
Landforms of Algeria